John Newcombe defeated Wilhelm Bungert in the final, 6–3, 6–1, 6–1 to win the gentlemen's singles tennis title at the 1967 Wimbledon Championships. Manuel Santana was the defending champion, but lost in the first round to Charlie Pasarell.

Seeds

  Manuel Santana (first round)
  Roy Emerson (fourth round)
  John Newcombe (champion)
  Tony Roche (second round)
  Cliff Drysdale (fourth round)
  Ken Fletcher (quarterfinals)
  Jan Leschly (second round)
  Bill Bowrey (third round)

Draw

Finals

Top half

Section 1

Section 2

Section 3

Section 4

Bottom half

Section 5

Section 6

Section 7

Section 8

References

External links

Men's Singles
Wimbledon Championship by year – Men's singles